Phai Lom may refer to:

 Phai Lom, Phitsanulok
 Phai Lom, Uttaradit
 Phai Lom, Ban Phaeng
 Phai Lom, Phachi